Telluric (from the Latin tellus, "earth") may refer to several things related to the Earth:
Telluric planet, see terrestrial planet, an Earth-like planet primarily composed of silicate rocks
Telluric current, a natural electric current in the Earth's crust
Telluric contamination, contamination of astronomical spectra by the Earth's atmosphere (also can be referred to as Telluric lines or Telluric bands)
Telluric compound, a compound which contains tellurium in the +6 oxidation state
Telluric (album), a 2016 album by the Australian singer-songwriter Matt Corby